Lure of the West is a 1926 American silent Western film starring Eileen Sedgwick. Directed by Alan James.

Cast
 Eileen Sedgwick 
 Les Bates
 Ray Childs
 Dutch Maley
 Alfred Hewston
 Elsie Bower
 Karl Silvera

References

External links
 

1926 films
1926 Western (genre) films
Films directed by Alan James
Chesterfield Pictures films
American black-and-white films
Silent American Western (genre) films
1920s English-language films
1920s American films